Oto Haščák (born 31 January 1964) is a Slovak former ice hockey player. He competed in the men's tournaments at the 1988 Winter Olympics, the 1994 Winter Olympics and the 1998 Winter Olympics.

Career statistics

Regular season and playoffs

International

References

External links
 

1964 births
Boston Bruins draft picks
HK Dukla Trenčín players
Ice hockey players at the 1988 Winter Olympics
Ice hockey players at the 1994 Winter Olympics
Ice hockey players at the 1998 Winter Olympics
Living people
Olympic ice hockey players of Czechoslovakia
Olympic ice hockey players of Slovakia
Sportspeople from Martin, Slovakia
PSG Berani Zlín players
Södertälje SK players
VHK Vsetín players
Czechoslovak expatriate sportspeople in Sweden
Czechoslovak expatriate ice hockey people
Czechoslovak ice hockey centres
Slovak ice hockey centres
Slovak expatriate ice hockey players in Sweden
Slovak expatriate ice hockey players in Germany
Slovak expatriate ice hockey players in Finland
Slovak expatriate ice hockey players in the Czech Republic